Conoy can refer to:
 Conoy tribe, also called the Piscataway tribe
 Conoy Creek, a stream in Lancaster County, Pennsylvania
 Piscataway language, also known as Conoy
 Conoy Township, Lancaster County, Pennsylvania
 Leoben Conoy, a character in the 2003 series of Battlestar Galactica